The Abierto Juvenil Mexicano is a prestigious junior tennis tournament played on outdoor red clay courts in November in Mexico City. It is one of five Grade A tournaments, the junior equivalent of ATP Masters or WTA Premier Mandatory events in terms of rankings points allocated.

History
The Abierto Juvenil Mexicano has been classified as a Grade A tournament since 2004. It was previously was also a Grade 1 tournament from 1998 to 2003. The tournament was founded in 1977 as the Copa Internacional Casablanca.

Singles champions

Doubles champions

Notes

References

External links
 
 List of champions

Junior tennis
Recurring sporting events established in 1977
Tennis tournaments in Mexico
Clay court tennis tournaments